Jacksonville is an unincorporated community in Jefferson Township, Switzerland County, in the U.S. state of Indiana.

History
Jacksonville was platted in 1815. A post office was established at Jacksonville in 1841, and remained in operation until it was discontinued in 1867.

Geography

References

Unincorporated communities in Switzerland County, Indiana
Unincorporated communities in Indiana